Jorge or Jordi Goset i Rubio (6 May 193330 June 2018), better known as Gosset, was a Spanish cartoonist.

Biography

In the 1960s, he created for  his most successful series: " (1965) about a simple-minded caveman who is always unsuccessfully trying to catch dinosaurs to eat; "" (1966) about the comic misadventures of a salakot-wearing wannabe adventurer who travels around the world; and "" (1967) about an average man who keeps unsuccessfully trying to enjoy his Sundays.

In the 1970s, he created "Roquita", which was set in the same world as "Hug, el Troglodita", for the magazine  and "Carpeto Veto", about a reactionary short man dressed completely in black who despises all modern things.

After the closure of Bruguera in 1986, he published "Burrus and Sapiens" for the magazine .

References

Bibliography

External links 
Comic creator: Gosset in Lambiek Comiclopedia

1933 births
2018 deaths
Year of birth uncertain
Spanish comics artists
Spanish comics writers
Artists from Barcelona